Cognola is a town in the Trentino province, Italy. Administratively it counts as one of the frazioni of the comune (municipality) of Trento, the third town of the Alps when it comes to population.

It has a population of about 5,000 inhabitants.

Frazioni of Trentino
Trento